Quality control (QC) is a process by which entities review the quality of all factors involved in production. ISO 9000 defines quality control as "a part of quality management focused on fulfilling quality requirements".

This approach places emphasis on three aspects (enshrined in standards such as ISO 9001):

 Elements such as controls, job management, defined and well managed processes, performance and integrity criteria, and identification of records
 Competence, such as knowledge, skills, experience, and qualifications
 Soft elements, such as personnel, integrity, confidence, organizational culture, motivation, team spirit, and quality relationships.

Inspection is a major component of quality control, where physical product is examined visually (or the end results of a service are analyzed). Product inspectors will be provided with lists and descriptions of unacceptable product defects such as cracks or surface blemishes for example.

History and introduction 

Early stone tools such as anvils had no holes and were not designed as interchangeable parts. Mass production established processes for the creation of parts and system with identical dimensions and design, but these processes are not uniform and hence some customers were unsatisfied with the result. Quality control separates the act of testing products to uncover defects from the decision to allow or deny product release, which may be determined by fiscal constraints. For contract work, particularly work awarded by government agencies, quality control issues are among the top reasons for not renewing a contract.

The simplest form of quality control was a sketch of the desired item. If the sketch did not match the item, it was rejected, in a simple Go/no go procedure. However, manufacturers soon found it was difficult and costly to make parts be exactly like their depiction; hence around 1840 tolerance limits were introduced, wherein a design would function if its parts were measured to be within the limits. Quality was thus precisely defined using devices such as plug gauges and ring gauges. However, this did not address the problem of defective items; recycling or disposing of the waste adds to the cost of production, as does trying to reduce the defect rate. Various methods have been proposed to prioritize quality control issues and determine whether to leave them unaddressed or use quality assurance techniques to improve and stabilize production.

Notable approaches
There is a tendency for individual consultants and organizations to name their own unique approaches to quality control—a few of these have ended up in widespread use:

In project management
In project management, quality control requires the project manager and/or the project team to inspect the accomplished work to ensure its alignment with the project scope. In practice, projects typically have a dedicated quality control team which focuses on this area.

See also
Analytical quality control
Corrective and preventative action (CAPA)
Eight dimensions of quality
First article inspection (FAI)
Good Automated Manufacturing Practice (GAMP)
Good manufacturing practice
Quality assurance
Quality management framework
Standard operating procedure (SOP)
QA/QC

References

Further reading

External links
ASTM quality control standards

 
Design for X
Quality management